Redenham Park is an estate in the civil parish of Appleshaw, Hampshire, England, surrounding Redenham House, an 18th-century Grade II* listed country house.

The house was built in 1784 for Sir Charles Pollen and is a classical mansion faced with Bath stone, standing to two storeys with a slate roof and sash windows, and a central porch with coupled Ionic columns.

It descended in the Pollen family via Sir John Pollen, 2nd Baronet to the latter's great nephew Sir Richard Hungerford Pollen, 4th Baronet.

In the late 19th century the house was occupied by Major A.W.Fulcher, a well-known cricketer and yachtsman.

From 1976 the house and estate belonged to Sir John Clark, the chairman of Plessey. It is now occupied by his widow, Lady Olivia Clark.

The park and gardens have been described as 'the perfect setting for a Jane Austen novel'. They comprise 2.5 hectares of garden, 24 hectares of parkland, 36.5 hectares of woodland and 337 hectares of farmland. The gardens are featured in The Good Gardens Guide and are open to the public by appointment.

Notes

References

External links 
Parks and Gardens database entry
Redenham House in its parkland
Saga Magazine on the gardens
The Good Gardens Guide entry for Redenham Park

Country houses in Hampshire
Gardens in Hampshire
Grade II* listed buildings in Hampshire